Jake Xerxes Fussell (born November 9, 1981 in Columbus, Georgia) is an American singer and guitarist who plays folk and blues music, with a focus on traditional Southern folk songs.

Background

Fussell was raised in Columbus, Georgia, the son of Fred C. Fussell, a folklorist, curator, and photographer. As a teenager Jake began playing and studying with elder musicians in the Chattahoochee Valley, apprenticing with Piedmont blues legend Precious Bryant, with whom he toured and recorded. He joined a Phenix City, Alabama country band who were students of Jimmie Tarlton of Darby and Tarlton, and accompanied Etta Baker in concert in North Carolina.

Before releasing his debut album, Fussell recorded vernacular Southern Music in the field with music historian, George Mitchell and Grammy Award-winning folklorist, Art Rosenbaum. He often leverages his knowledge of traditional American folk music in his own work, for example, by adapting the cry of a 19th Century fishmonger for his song "The River St. John’s".

Fussell has appeared on A Prairie Home Companion. He toured in the U.S. as an opening act for Wilco, Bill Callahan, and The Decemberists.

Music
In 2015, Fussell released his debut self-titled album composed entirely of adapted folk and blues songs. William Tyler produced the album and contributed features on the guitar and organ. Chris Scruggs recorded features on steel guitar, bass, and mandolin, and Hoot Hester on the fiddle.

In 2017, Fussell released his second album, What in the Natural World. Writing for The New Yorker, Amanda Petrusich named What in the Natural World to her, "My Ten Best Albums of 2017".

Fussell released his third album in January 2019. In a review of his 2019 album Out of Sight, Pitchfork magazine noted, Musicians like Jake Xerxes Fussell are nearly as rare nowadays as the material he performs. “All songs are traditional & in the public domain,” reads the sole composition credit on Out of Sight, Fussell’s often-transcendent third album. Put another way: Each of these nine songs survived the great folk-pop copyright round-up of the 1950s and ’60s (and beyond), when publishers hunted down and claimed untold numbers of “traditional” melodies as their own.

Discography

References

1981 births
Living people
People from Columbus, Georgia
Singers from Georgia (U.S. state)
Guitarists from Georgia (U.S. state)
American blues musicians
American folk musicians